Goudiry is the chief town and commune of the department of Goudiry in the region of Tambacounda in the east of Senegal. The town itself has a population of approximately 7000.

Transport 
It lies on the N1 road linking the capital Dakar to Mali and is also served by a station on the national railway system.

See also 
 Railway stations in Senegal

References 

Populated places in Tambacounda Region
Communes of Senegal